The 2013 Munster Senior Football Championship was that year's installment of the annual Munster Senior Football Championship held under the auspices of the Munster GAA. It was won by Kerry who defeated Cork in the final. It was Kerry's 75th title. Cork defeated Limerick and Clare, while Kerry defeated Tipperary and Waterford on their way to the final.
The winning Kerry team received the Munster Championship Cup, and automatically advanced to the quarter-final stage of the 2013 All-Ireland Senior Football Championship.

Bracket

Quarter-finals

Semi-finals

Final

References

External links
 Munster GAA website

2M
Munster Senior Football Championship